Bali is a Local Government Area in Taraba State, Nigeria. 

Its headquarters are in the town of Bali.

The Major Tribe in Bali are Jukun, Fulani/Jibu, Chamba etc. A settlement of the Tiv, Igbo  Mumuye and Niger Delta tribes can be found there. Each tribes have their own traditional head overseeing the affairs of their subjects.

1. ALH. KABIRU MOHAMMED GIDADO MISA.
the 10th LAMDO BAKUNDI Bali.

He Ascended the Throne of his Late Father.

It has an area of 9,146 km and a population of 208,935 at the 2006 census.

The postal code of the area is 672.

Bali is a developing town, one hour, fifteen minutes drive from the capital city, Jalingo.

The waters, mountains and vegetation could be the inspiration for the state's slogan 'Nature's Gift to the Nation' 

Bali possess rich soil for that yields massive agricultural outcome at the end of every farming seasons and this is a major source of income for the inhabitants.

There are quite a handful of schools for the young ones, both missionary schools, public schools and private schools. The higher institution is The Federal Polytechnic, Bali. The Local Government secretariat, police station and the ministry of Education are public properties.

Despite the growing population and vast immigration, Bali is yet to have financial institutions, factories and other establishments that could create employment for the majority. There is the presence of Union Bank Plc (currently the only bank), POS outlets, etc.

Trade and small businesses are well handled by the Igbos and Hausas specifically. Other tribes do well in farming, storage of farm produces and the likes.

Bali markets are open to all, far and wide. The exceptional Friday market blooms mainly on Friday. 

Bali is described as a peaceful place with peaceful, accommodating and welcoming people.

Education
Federal Polytechnic

References

Local Government Areas in Taraba State